The men's 3 metre springboard was one of five diving events on the diving at the 1920 Summer Olympics programme. The competition was held on Friday, 26 August 1920 and on Saturday, 27 August 1920, at the Stade Nautique d'Antwerp.

A point-for-place system was used. For each dive, the divers were ranked according to their dive score and awarded points based on their rank for that dive (the best dive earned 1 point, the next-best 2 points, and so on).

Fourteen divers from nine nations competed. Louis Kuehn from the United States won the gold medal. Clarence Pinkston took silver and Louis Balbach won bronze, making a full American podium.

Results

First round 
The three divers who scored the smallest number of points in each group of the first round advanced to the final.

Group 1

Group 2

Final

References

Sources
 
 

Men
1920
Men's events at the 1920 Summer Olympics